M.Karuppampatti is a village in Tiruchirappalli district, Musiri  Taluk, Thathaiyangarpet union, Mettupalayam, Tiruchirappalli town panchayat in the Indian state of Tamil Nadu.

Administration Authorities 

 Mettupalayam, Tiruchirappalli Town panchayat
 Thathaiyangarpet Panchayat Union
 Musiri Taluk
 Tiruchirapalli District
 Tamil Nadu
 India

Facilities available 

 Government Child care
 Government Preliminary School
 Library
 Agriculture Co-operative Society
 Preliminary Health Assistant Center
 Branch Post Office

Economy 
 Majority of the people (90%) are small scale farmers and farm labours. 
 Government officials (2%)

Transport 
Several bus connections are available.

Government Sponsored ongoing project
 Tamil Nadu Afforestation Project (Japan Aided)

References

Villages in Tiruchirappalli district